Mika-Matti Petteri Paatelainen (born 3 February 1967) is a Finnish former professional football player and the head coach of Veikkausliiga club HIFK. He scored 18 goals in 70 appearances for the Finnish national team, which makes him Finland's all time thirteenth most capped player and fifth top goalscorer. He is the eldest of three brothers, all of whom have played professional football. Their father Matti was also a Finnish international.

Paatelainen had a 20-year playing career, playing for nine clubs in four countries. Most of his career was spent in the Scottish leagues, with Dundee United, Aberdeen, Hibernian, St Johnstone and St Mirren. He also played for Valkeakosken Haka in Finland, Bolton Wanderers and Wolverhampton Wanderers in England and RC Strasbourg in France. While at Bolton, Paatelainen became the first Finn to play in the Premier League.

After retiring as a player in 2005, Paatelainen became manager of Scottish club Cowdenbeath, where he helped the club win the championship of Scottish Football League Third Division and earn a promotion. After a season coaching in his native Finland with TPS, Paatelainen returned to Scotland as manager of Hibernian. He left that position by mutual consent after 18 months. After a year out of the game, Paatelainen was appointed manager of Kilmarnock. He was Kilmarnock manager for less than one season, but enjoyed personal success during that time. He was appointed manager of the Finland national team in March 2011, a position he held until June 2015. He was appointed as Dundee United manager in October 2015, parting company with the club in May 2016 after their relegation to the Scottish Championship. He has subsequently managed Ubon United in Thailand, and the national teams of Latvia and Hong Kong.

Club career
Paatelainen made his debut for Valkeakosken Haka in 1985. He played 48 league matches for Haka, scoring 18 goals. During his debut season, Haka won the Finnish Cup, the only honour of the club during his time there.

In October 1987, Scottish Premier Division club Dundee United signed him for a £100,000 transfer fee. He scored on his debut a day later and quickly established himself as a first team regular, scoring 11 goals in his first season, including four goals in a 7–0 rout of Morton in April 1988. Paatelainen also helped Dundee United reach the Scottish Cup Final in May 1988, although had to settle for a runners-up medal as United lost 2–1 to Celtic. He was the club's top scorer for the following two seasons, and in total scored 47 times in 173 matches for United.

In March 1992, he transferred to Aberdeen for £400,000. During the three seasons he stayed there, he scored 23 goals in 75 matches. Paatelainen played in two cup finals during his time at Pittodrie, but lost to Rangers in October 1992 in the League Cup Final and in May 1993 lost to the same opposition in the Scottish Cup Final.

Paatelainen transferred in 1994 to English club Bolton Wanderers. The team was promoted to the Premier League in his first season with the club, which then meant that Paatelainen became the first Finnish footballer to play in the Premier League (as the old First Division had been rebranded in 1992). He played a crucial part in the promotion triumph, putting Bolton 3–2 ahead in their playoff final clash with Reading in extra time on their way to a 4–3 victory which ended a 15-year exile from the top flight.

Paatelainen also played in the 1995 League Cup Final, in which Wanderers were beaten 2–1 by Liverpool. He was unable to keep Bolton in the Premier League in 1995–96, although they did return the next season by winning the Division One title with 100 goals and 98 points. He then played for Wolverhampton Wanderers during the 1997–98 season. He failed to score for Wolves in the league but scored four times in their FA Cup run, with goals against Darlington (two), Charlton Athletic and Wimbledon. He also scored once in the League Cup, against Queens Park Rangers.

After his spell in Wolverhampton, Paatelainen decided to return to Scotland in the summer of 1998; this time signing for Edinburgh club Hibernian. Hibs had been relegated the previous season, and Paatelainen's twelve goals in his first season helped his side get promotion back to the top division in Scotland. He is fondly remembered by Hibernian supporters for his hat-trick in a 6–2 victory over Edinburgh derby rivals Heart of Midlothian on 22 October 2000. Paatelainien's appearance for Hibs in their 2001 Scottish Cup Final defeat by Celtic meant that he became the first player to play in the Scottish Cup final with three clubs. Despite this, Paatelainien never collected a winners medal in the competition. Paatelainen left Hibs in 2001 to sign for French club Strasbourg. He then returned to Hibs for one season, where he combined his playing duties with coaching the youths.

In 2003, he transferred to St Johnstone, when Hibs no longer wished to extend his contract, also acting as an assistant manager. Paatelainen only stayed with St Johnstone for one season. Paatelainen then transferred to St Mirren, where he also served as an assistant manager. This was his last club. During his playing career Paatelainen scored 143 league goals.

International career
Paatelainen played 70 matches for Finland, scoring 18 goals. He played his first international match on 9 September 1986, against East Germany. One of his feats in the national team was scoring four goals in a single match against San Marino, which stands as a record number of goals in one match for Finland. He retired from international football in 2000. In addition to his appearances for the senior national team, Paatelainen also played eight matches each for the Finland under-21s and the under-19s.

Coaching career

Cowdenbeath
Having previously worked as a coach while still playing for St Johnstone and St Mirren, Paatelainen was appointed full-time manager of Scottish Third Division part-time football team Cowdenbeath in August 2005. In his first season, he guided the Blue Brazil to their first league title in 67 years. He signed his brothers Markus and Mikko for the club.

TPS
On 21 October 2006, Paatelainen resigned as manager of Cowdenbeath to join Finnish club TPS. He guided TPS to third place and UEFA Intertoto Cup qualification in what was to be his only season in charge.

Hibernian
Paatelainen was linked with the managerial vacancy at former club Hibernian in December 2007, and he was appointed on 10 January 2008. He commented upon taking the job that he wanted to make Hibs play a bit more direct, which he later claimed was misinterpreted as him wanting to play a long ball game. Paatelainen took the Hibs job at a time when they had only won one of their previous ten games and had slipped into the bottom half of the Scottish Premier League. Hibs’ results initially improved under Paatelainen and the club secured a place in the top half of the league.

During the 2008–09 season, Paatelainen came under increasing pressure from Hibs fans due to poor results and his favouring of a 4–3–3 system. Paatelainen eventually abandoned 4–3–3 in favour of a more orthodox 4–4–2 system. He was criticised by Abdessalam Benjelloun, who accused Paatelainen of favouring outdated long ball tactics. Paatelainen responded by saying that Benjelloun was "frustrated" at not being a regular pick for club or country. A poor run of results early in 2009 led to many Hibs supporters calling for Paatelainen to be sacked, but he did manage to lead the team into the top half of the league again. Paatelainen was also praised by the media for his tactical approach in winning the last Edinburgh derby of the season, but he left the job by mutual consent at the end of May after a disappointing season.

Kilmarnock
After a year out of the game, Paatelainen was appointed manager of Kilmarnock on 23 June 2010. Paatelainen has earned plaudits from the Scottish media for his early work with Kilmarnock. In November 2010, he was linked with the head coach position of the Finland national football team. Paatelainen won the manager of the month award for December 2010, as Kilmarnock continued their good start with two league wins, against Hibernian and Inverness CT, and a draw at Celtic Park. Kilmarnock offered him a long-term contract in March 2011, in an attempt to frustrate interest in Paatelainen from Scunthorpe United. The approach from Scunthorpe was rejected by Paatelainen, but soon afterwards he accepted an offer from Finland. Despite having left Kilmarnock in March, Paatelainen won the SFWA Manager of the Year award for the 2010–11 season.

Finland national team
Following a bad start by Finland in UEFA Euro 2012 qualifying and their decline in the FIFA World Rankings from 33 to 86, head coach Stuart Baxter was sacked. Paatelainen was appointed as the new Finland head coach on 31 March 2011. His first match as a head coach was a 1–0 away win against San Marino on 3 June, but Finland then suffered a 5–0 defeat by Sweden in his second game. Both matches were part of the UEFA Euro 2012 qualifying process.

Paatelainen's deal with the Finnish Football Association extended to 2016, covering not only the UEFA Euro 2012 qualifiers but also the FIFA World Cup 2014 and the UEFA Euro 2016 qualifiers. As Finland was already eliminated from UEFA Euro 2012, Paatelainen's task was to renew the national team and try to qualify for one or more of the tournaments during his projected tenure as Finland's head coach. On 14 June 2015 Paatelainen was sacked following his fourth defeat in a row during the UEFA Euro 2016 qualifying campaign.

Dundee United
Paatelainen was announced as the new head coach of Dundee United in October 2015, having signed a contract until 2018. His first match in charge of the club was a 1–0 defeat to Hearts at Tannadice. He was unable to prevent the side from relegation, which was confirmed by a Dundee derby defeat on 2 May 2016, and he left United two days later.

Latvia national team
Paatelainen was appointed head coach of the Latvia national team in May 2018. On 4 December, he announced that he won't continue as the head coach of the team after his contract expires at the end of the month.

Hong Kong national team
Paatelainen was appointed as the head coach of the Hong Kong representative team in April 2019 on a two-year contract, succeeding Gary White. After a dismal campaign having only achieved a win from twelve games in charge, Mixu's contract was not renewed.

HIFK

After his contract with the Hong Kong national football team was not renewed, Mixu was appointed manager of Finnish club HIFK for the 2022 season. However after the club's relegation, Mixu was sacked having only obtained a single win during the season.

In popular culture
Paatelainen's time at Bolton Wanderers led to him being mentioned in the comedy show Phoenix Nights, which was set in the Bolton area. This happened when the doormen Max & Paddy drunkenly made a prank call to their boss Brian Potter, claiming that Paatelainen worked at the Coroner's office in Bolton and that the club was on fire.

Career statistics

Club

Asterisk (*) indicates that more matches and goals may yet emerge as cup records are investigated.

International goals

Managerial statistics

Honours

Player
Valkeakosken Haka
Finnish Cup: 1985

Bolton Wanderers
Football League First Division play-offs: 1994–95
Football League First Division: 1996–97

Hibernian
Scottish First Division: 1998–99

Manager
Cowdenbeath
Scottish Third Division: 2005–06

Latvia
Baltic Cup: 2018

Individual
Scottish Premier League Player of the Month: October 2000
Scottish Premier League Manager of the Month: February 2008, March 2009, December 2010
Scottish Premier League Manager of the Season: 2010–11

References

External links

Playing Stats at Hibernian at FitbaStats
Managerial Record at Hibernian at FitbaStats

1967 births
Living people
Footballers from Helsinki
Finnish footballers
Association football forwards
FC Haka players
Dundee United F.C. players
Aberdeen F.C. players
Bolton Wanderers F.C. players
Wolverhampton Wanderers F.C. players
Hibernian F.C. players
RC Strasbourg Alsace players
Cowdenbeath F.C. players
St Johnstone F.C. players
St Mirren F.C. players
Mestaruussarja players
Scottish Football League players
English Football League players
Premier League players
Scottish Premier League players
Ligue 2 players
Finland international footballers
Finnish expatriate footballers
Finnish expatriate sportspeople in Scotland
Finnish expatriate sportspeople in England
Finnish expatriate sportspeople in France
Expatriate footballers in Scotland
Expatriate footballers in England
Expatriate footballers in France
Finnish football managers
Hibernian F.C. non-playing staff
St Johnstone F.C. non-playing staff
St Mirren F.C. non-playing staff
Cowdenbeath F.C. managers
TPS Turku football managers
Hibernian F.C. managers
Kilmarnock F.C. managers
Finland national football team managers
Dundee United F.C. managers
Mixu Paatelainen
Latvia national football team managers
Hong Kong national football team managers
Scottish Football League managers
Veikkausliiga managers
Scottish Premier League managers
Scottish Professional Football League managers
Mixu Paatelainen
Finnish expatriate football managers
Finnish expatriate sportspeople in Thailand
Finnish expatriate sportspeople in Latvia
Finnish expatriate sportspeople in Hong Kong
Expatriate football managers in Scotland
Expatriate football managers in Thailand
Expatriate football managers in Latvia
Expatriate football managers in Hong Kong